"Don't Fight It" is a rock song performed by Kenny Loggins and Steve Perry, the lead singer for Journey at that time. It is included on Loggins' 1982 album High Adventure.

Background
Loggins has described the song as 'an experiment in pushing my limits to include rock', from the liner notes of his 1997 compilation Yesterday, Today, Tomorrow.

According to Loggins, the bullwhip sound effect in the song was created using a whip that was also used for the Indiana Jones movies.

It was released as a single on August 10, 1982.  It peaked at number 17 on the US Billboard Hot 100 and #15 on the Cash Box Top 100.  It was nominated for Best Rock Performance by a Duo or Group with Vocal at the 1983 Grammy Awards.

Track listing
US 7" single
 "Don't Fight It" - 3:37
 "The More We Try" - 3:59

Credits and personnel
Kenny Loggins - Co-lead Vocals & Rhythm Guitar 
Steve Perry - Co-lead Vocals
Neil Giraldo - Lead Guitar
Mike Hamilton - Bass
Dennis Conway - Drums
Tris Imboden - Percussion

Chart performance

Cover versions 
In 1984, Kids Incorporated covered "Don't Fight It" in the Season 1 episode "The Ghost of the P*lace." Kids Incorporated covered the song again in 1986 in the Season 3 episode "Boy Wonder".

References 

1982 songs
1982 singles
1980s ballads
Columbia Records singles
Kenny Loggins songs
Steve Perry (musician) songs
Songs written by Kenny Loggins
Songs written by Steve Perry
Songs written by Dean Pitchford
Male vocal duets